Casa Córdova, also known as Casa de las Conchas (Spanish for 'seashell house'), is a historic building located at 14 Gonzalo Marín Street in the historic center of the Puerto Rican municipality of Arecibo. The historic residence, now a commercial building, was added to the United States National Register of Historic Places on November 17, 1986.

The wood and brick commercial-residence building was built in 1898 during a period of architectural transition inspired by Neoclassical and Beaux-Arts styles.

References 

Houses completed in 1898
National Register of Historic Places in Arecibo, Puerto Rico
1898 establishments in Puerto Rico
Córdova
Beaux-Arts architecture in Puerto Rico
Neoclassical architecture in Puerto Rico